Two-Fisted Sheriff is a 1937 American Western film directed by Leon Barsha, starring Charles Starrett and Barbara Weeks.

Cast
 Charles Starrett as Sheriff Dick Houston
 Barbara Weeks as Molly Herrick
 Bruce Lane as Bob Pearson
 Edward Peil Sr. as Judge Webster
 Allan Sears as Alan SearsBill Slagg
 Walter Downing as Doc Pierce
 Ernie Adams as Sheriff Rankin
 Claire McDowell as Miss Herrick
 Frank Ellis as Gargan
 Robert Walker as Lyons
 George Chesebro as Prosecutor Ed

References

1937 films
American Western (genre) films
1937 Western (genre) films
American black-and-white films
Films directed by Leon Barsha
Columbia Pictures films
1930s English-language films
1930s American films